The Wran ministry (1984) or Sixth Wran ministry was the 76th ministry of the New South Wales Government, and was led by the 35th Premier of New South Wales, Neville Wran, representing the Labor Party. It was the sixth of eight consecutive occasions when Wran was Premier.

Background
Wran had been elected to the Legislative Council of New South Wales by a joint sitting of the New South Wales Parliament on 12 March 1970. He was Leader of the Opposition in the Legislative Council from 22 February 1972. He resigned from the council on 19 October 1973 to switch to the Legislative Assembly, successfully contesting the election for Bass Hill, which he would hold until his retirement in 1986. Wran successfully challenged Pat Hills to become Leader of Labor Party and Leader of the Opposition from 3 December 1973 and became Premier following a narrow one seat victory at the 1976 election.

Labor retained government at the 1981 election, gaining an additional 6 seats despite a 2% swing against Labor, giving a majority of 19 seats in the Legislative Assembly and two seats in the Legislative Council. The reconfiguration of the ministry was triggered by the resignation in February 1984 of Jack Ferguson, who had been Wran's deputy since 1973 and Deputy Premier since 1976.

Composition of ministry
The ministry covers the period from 10 February 1984 when Wran reconfigured his ministry following the resignation of Jack Ferguson, until 5 April 1984 when Wran reconfigured his ministry after the Wran–led Labor Party was re-elected at the 1984 election, and the Seventh Wran ministry was formed.

 
Ministers are members of the Legislative Assembly unless otherwise noted.

See also

Members of the New South Wales Legislative Assembly, 1981–1984
Members of the New South Wales Legislative Council, 1981–1984

Notes

References

 

New South Wales ministries
1984 establishments in Australia
1984 disestablishments in Australia
Australian Labor Party ministries in New South Wales